Fred W. Gushurst (July 22, 1890 – December 28, 1977) was an American football player and coach. He served as the head football coach at the South Dakota School of Mines in Deadwood, South Dakota in 1917 and from 1919 to 1920. Gushurst played college football at the University of Notre Dame in South Bend, Indiana.

References

External links
 

1890 births
1977 deaths
American football halfbacks
Notre Dame Fighting Irish football players
South Dakota Mines Hardrockers football coaches
People from Lead, South Dakota
Players of American football from South Dakota